Carlos Amaral Freire is a Brazilian scholar, linguist and translator. He has mastered more than 30 languages in the sense that he has the theoretical and practical knowledge that makes it possible for him to communicate in them, but he can make translations, read, and write in others. He has studied more than a hundred twenty languages, but he has half-forgotten many of them, which would need a little study to come back in conversation skills. He still studies two new languages each year.

Freire's Babel de Poemas is a polylingual anthology with translations of poems from 60 languages.

Publications
 Babel de Poemas
 Los fonemas oclusivos y africados del aymara y del georgiano

References
Interview in Jornaleco

Year of birth missing (living people)
Living people
Brazilian translators
Translators to Portuguese
Greek–Portuguese translators
Spanish–Portuguese translators
German–Portuguese translators
Translators from Georgian
Arabic–Portuguese translators
Italian–Portuguese translators
English–Portuguese translators
French–Portuguese translators
Russian–Portuguese translators
Translators from Chinese